The Avala Tower is a  tall telecommunications tower located on Mount Avala, in Belgrade, Serbia. The original tower was finished in 1965, but was destroyed on 29 April 1999, during the NATO bombing of Yugoslavia. The tower's reconstruction commenced on 21 December 2006 and it was officially opened on 21 April 2010.

History

Origin 

The tower was designed by architects Uglješa Bogunović and Slobodan Janjić, and engineer Milan Krstić. Contractor was the "Rad" construction company. Construction started on 14 October 1961 and was completed four years later, in 1965. It was the only tower in the world to have an equilateral triangle as its cross section, and one of very few towers not perched directly into the ground, but standing on its legs. The legs formed a tripod, the symbol of Serbian tripod chair (tronožac). It is one of the small number of towers to be constructed in that manner.

The tower was surmounted by an antenna, which was at first used for black and white television transmission. In 1971 the antenna was replaced by a new one for color TV transmission and the emitting of the TV Belgrade's Second program in color began on 31 December 1971. Also, the first digital terrestrial television in Serbia was emitted from the tower.

The project, which was of high risk, was finished without any worker injuries or deaths, which was unusual for a project of its size.

1999 bombing 

The Avala Tower was destroyed on 29 April 1999 by NATO bombardment. Previously the power supply to the station was destroyed, but a senior military officer installed a backup generator. The intent of the bombing was to put Radio Television Serbia (RTS) permanently off the air for the duration of the war; however RTS was relayed on a network of local TV stations which relayed its programming throughout the whole of Serbia. The Avala Tower was a symbol of pride and a famous landmark, not only of Belgrade and Serbia, but of the former Yugoslavia too. The tower was one of the last buildings to be destroyed before the end of the NATO operation. The tower was destroyed by two laser-guided bombs GBU-27 that hit one leg of the tower, causing its collapse.

Reconstruction 

The idea of the tower's reconstruction at the same place it was destroyed originated from the Journalists' Association of Serbia in October 2002. In the early 2004, Radio Television Serbia (RTS) joined in with the media promotion of the project and commenced a series of fund-raising events in order to collect money for the construction. The project was endorsed and supported by numerous media, painters, writers, actors, musicians, athletes and businessmen. It is estimated that a million people, through various activities, supported the project.

An agreement regarding its construction was signed by Dušan Basara, director of the construction sector of the Ratko Mitrović Company – which was in charge of the construction of the tower – and general director of RTS, Aleksandar Tijanić. Many fund-raising events have been held for the collection of funds so a new tower can be constructed. One of the first was a match between Serbian grand slam-winning tennis players Ana Ivanovic and Novak Djokovic. All the proceeds went to the Avala Tower fund. Ceca Ražnatović (a Serbian folk singer) held a concert on 15 June 2006, with all the proceeds going to the Avala Tower fund. RTS ran commercials for donations to rebuild the tower. According to a December 2006 report, when it was announced that the construction of a new Avala Tower would commence that same month, over €1 million was collected through fund-raising and donations.

As the NATO used projectiles with depleted uranium, the military first conducted surveys to check for the contamination of the debris, before giving the green light for construction works. Clearing of the site began on 21 June 2005. Over one million tons of rubble was removed. Seismic survey followed and the construction works started on 21 December 2006. Initially, completion of the new tower was expected in August 2008, but construction works were severely delayed. The opening date was pushed back to 29 April 2009, the tenth anniversary of its destruction. Radio Television Serbia reported on 23 October 2009 that the tower had been completed.

Materials used include 5,880 tons of concrete and 500 tons of reinforcement bars.

Today 

The tower had 137,000 visitors in 2016, 155,000 in 2017 and 185,000 in 2018. In June 2017 the tourist complex was opened at the base of the tower. It includes, among other facilities, a restaurant, ethno-gallery, souvenir shop, sports fields and outdoor gym. By August 2017, a 105 cement prints of the people who helped the reconstruction were displayed, including those of tennis players Novak Djokovic and Ana Ivanovic and a new lift, for the parents with children and the disabled, have been constructed.

In 2018 the children area at the base was expanded with the elf village, consisting of houses connected by a small bridge. A classroom in the open was set in the pine forest and the artificial climbing rock was built. On 19 October 2018, a colorful decorative light on the entire tower became operational.

Gallery

Radio and TV frequencies 

FM radio:
 95.3 MHz – Radio Belgrade 1
 97.6 MHz – Radio Belgrade 2/3
 98.5 MHz – Hit FM
 104.0 MHz – Radio Belgrade 202

DVB-T2 digital television:
 UHF channel 22 – MUX 1 (national):
 RTS1
 RTS2
 RTS3
 RTV Pink
 B92
 Prva Srpska Televizija
 Happy TV
 UHF channel 28 – MUX 2:
 regional and local TV stations, including Studio B
 UHF channel 45 – MUX 3:
 pay TV services

See also 

 List of tallest buildings in Serbia
 Architecture of Belgrade
 List of towers
 List of masts These are also often used as for TV broadcasts.

References

External links 

 Beobuild Archive : Rebuilding phases and photos of Avala Tower
 New tower fireworks dedication
 Avala Tower Fans Association
 Avala Tower at skyscraperpage.com
 Virtual tour @ Avala Tower
 

1960s in Belgrade
Towers in Serbia
Demolished buildings and structures in Serbia
Towers completed in 1965
Towers completed in 2009
Buildings and structures demolished in 1999
Television in Serbia
Radio masts and towers in Europe
Rebuilt buildings and structures in Serbia
2009 establishments in Serbia
2000s in Belgrade
Observation towers
1965 establishments in Yugoslavia